Veronique Delphine Delamare (17 February 18228 March 1848), born Couturier, was a French housewife who took numerous lovers and later committed suicide.  She was said to have been the inspiration for Gustave Flaubert's 1857 novel Madame Bovary.

Biography
Delamare was the daughter of a wealthy land owner.  She married an unexciting country doctor, and being bored, she took various lovers.  She committed suicide by taking prussic acid (known today as hydrogen cyanide).

An article published 1848 in the 'Journal de Rouen' told about Doctor Delamare's wife's death in the village of Ry near Rouen, where the house of the Delamares and the tombstone of Delphine Delamare are still to be seen.

Delamare's adulterous affairs, debts, and suicide were the inspiration for the character of Emma Bovary in Gustave Flaubert's Madame Bovary in 1857.  Her husband, Eugéne Delamare, had been a medical student of Flaubert's father.

References

 Semiotext(e)

Suicides by cyanide poisoning
1822 births
1848 deaths
1840s suicides
Suicides in France